Ek: The Power of One is a 2009 Indian Hindi-language action thriller film starring Bobby Deol, Nana Patekar and Shriya Saran. It is a remake of the Telugu-language film Athadu (2005).

Plot
 
Nandu an orphan turned assassin, somehow gets wrongly accused of a politician's murder and is on the run. On his escapade on a train, he meets Puran, who is homebound after eighteen years, they get chatting, and Nandu finds all about his joint family and the wedding of Puran's sister that he is going to attend.

However, the police catch up with Nandu on the train and shoot at him, but Puran gets hit accidentally and dies on the spot. Nandu goes to Puran's family home in his village to return his grandfather's watch and also to break the news of his grandson's death to him. However, it turns out that Puran's family mistakes Nandu for Puran and makes him a part of the celebration at home. He thinks that it is his responsibility to fulfill the deeds the Puran had to fulfill.

Preet, who is the daughter of Puran's grandfather's friend, is in awe of Nandu and falls in love with him. CBI Inspector Rane, is given the responsibility of tracking down the killer and is after Nandu.

At the end, Nandu realizes that his friend Shekar is behind everything. He has a tape of his innocence and gives it to Inspector Rane. He then goes back to Puran's family and lives with them.

Cast
 Bobby Deol as Nandkumar 'Nandu' Sharma / 'Fake' Puran Singh
 Shriya Saran as Preet Kaur
 Nana Patekar as CBI Inspector Nandkumar Rane
 Pradeep Kharab as Shekhar
 Sanjay Mishra as Advocate Parminder Singh
 Sachin Khedekar as Opposition Minister Anna Mhatre
 Kulbhushan Kharbanda as Kripal Singh
 Jackie Shroff as Savte (special appearance)
 Zarina Wahab as Gayatri bua
 Gurpreet Ghuggi as Guru
 Rana Ranbir as Dev
 Akshay Kapoor as Puran Singh
 Raghuveer Yadav as minister Joshi
 Vikramjeet Virk as in a (special appearance)
 Preeti Bhutani as Nandni
 Jaspal Bhatti as Amrik Singh Nasa
 Upasana Singh as Manjeet bua
 Dhritiman Chatterjee as Deputy inspector general of police DIG Shergill
 Ritu Vij as Balbir
 Anant Jog as Police Inspector 
 Chunky Pandey as Balli
 Rana Jung Bahadur as Chaudhary
 Shishir Sharma as CBI Chief
 Simran Deepali as Channo
 Ajaz Khan as Anna Mhatre's son

Soundtrack

The songs of the film were composed by Pritam, and the song "Bang Bang" was written by Mayur Puri.

References

External links
 

2009 films
2000s Hindi-language films
Hindi remakes of Telugu films
Films featuring songs by Pritam
Indian action thriller films
2009 action thriller films
Films about contract killing in India
Films directed by Sangeeth Sivan